Association Sportive des Fonctionnaires de Bobo Dioulasso also known as ASF Bobo Dioulasso for short is a Burkinabé football club based in Bobo Dioulasso. They play their home games at the Stade Municipal.

The club plays in yellow and black. It was founded on 20 January 1948.

Achievements

Burkinabé Premier League: 3
 1961, 1966, 2018.

Coupe du Faso: 5
 1986, 1989, 1997, 1998, 2004

Burkinabé Leaders Cup: 1
 1992.

Burkinabé SuperCup: 4
 1992–93, 1996–97, 2000–01, 2003–04.

Performance in CAF competitions
 African Cup of Champions Clubs: 2 appearances
1967 – First Round
1970 – First Round

CAF Confederation Cup: 1 appearance
2005 – Preliminary Round

CAF Cup Winners' Cup: 7 appearances
1986 – First Round
1989 – Second Round
1990 – First Round
1994 – First Round
1996 – First Round
1998 – First Round
1999 – First Round

Current squad

 
Football clubs in Burkina Faso
Association football clubs established in 1948
Bobo-Dioulasso
1948 establishments in French Upper Volta